Maximilian Karl Emil Weber (21 April 186414 June 1920) was a German sociologist, historian, jurist and political economist, who is regarded as among the most important theorists of the development of modern Western society. His ideas profoundly influence social theory and research. While Weber did not see himself as a sociologist, he is recognized as one of the fathers of sociology, along with Karl Marx and Émile Durkheim.

Unlike Durkheim, Weber did not believe in monocausal explanations, proposing instead that for any outcome there can be multiple causes. Also unlike Durkheim, Weber was a key proponent of methodological anti-positivism, arguing for the study of social action through interpretive rather than purely empiricist methods, based on a subjective understanding of the meanings that individuals attach to their own actions. Weber's main intellectual concern was in understanding the processes of rationalisation, secularisation, and the ensuing sense of "disenchantment". He formulated a thesis arguing that such processes are associated with the rise of capitalism and modernity.

Weber is also known for his thesis combining economic sociology and the sociology of religion, emphasising the importance of cultural influences embedded in religion as driving factors of capitalism. Weber first elaborated this theory in his seminal work The Protestant Ethic and the Spirit of Capitalism (1905), where he included ascetic Protestantism among the major "elective affinities" leading to the rise of market-driven capitalism and the rational-legal systems of practice in the Western world. Protestant Ethic was the earliest part in Weber's broader consideration of world religions, as he later examined the religions of China and India, as well as ancient Judaism, with particular regard to their differing economic consequences and conditions of social stratification. In another major work, "Politics as a Vocation", Weber defined "the state" as an entity that successfully claims a "monopoly of the legitimate use of physical force within a given territory". He was the first to categorise social authority into distinct forms: charismatic, traditional, and rational-legal. Weber's analysis of bureaucracy emphasized that modern institutions are increasingly based on rational-legal authority. Weber made a variety of other contributions in economic history, theory, and methodology. His ideas have been influential across the political spectrum—both among liberals and conservatives like Ludwig von Mises, Talcott Parsons, and Raymond Aron, and among radicals and critical theorists like György Lukács, Frankfurt School, and C. Wright Mills.

After the First World War, Weber was among the founders of the liberal German Democratic Party. He also ran unsuccessfully for a seat in parliament and served as advisor to the committee that drafted the ill-fated democratic Weimar Constitution of 1919. After contracting Spanish flu, he died of pneumonia in 1920, aged 56.

Personal life

Early life

Maximilian Karl Emil Weber was born on 21 April 1864 in Erfurt, Province of Saxony, Prussia, but his family moved to Berlin in 1869. He would be the oldest of eight children to Max Weber Sr. and his wife Helene Fallenstein. Over the course of his life, Weber Sr. held posts as a lawyer, a civil servant, and a parliamentarian for the National Liberal Party in the Prussian Landtag and German Reichstag. Fallenstein partly descended from French Huguenot immigrants  and came from a wealthy background. Over time, Weber Jr. would be affected by the marital and personality tensions between his father, "a man who enjoyed earthly pleasures" while overlooking religious and philanthropic causes, and his mother, a devout Calvinist "who sought to lead an ascetic life" and held moral absolutist ideas.

Weber Sr.'s involvement in public life immersed his home in both politics and academia, as his salon welcomed scholars and public figures like philosopher Wilhelm Dilthey and jurist Levin Goldschmidt. The young Weber and his brother Alfred, who also became a sociologist and economist, passed their formative years in this intellectual atmosphere. For Christmas in 1877, a thirteen-year-old Max Weber gifted his parents two historical essays, entitled "About the Course of German history, with Special Reference to the Positions of the Emperor and the Pope", and "About the Roman Imperial Period from Constantine to the Migration Period".

In class, bored and unimpressed with teacherswho, in turn, resented what they perceived as a disrespectful attitudeWeber secretly read all forty volumes by writer Johann Wolfgang von Goethe, and it has been argued that this was an important influence on his thought and methodology. Before entering university, he would read many other classical works, including those by philosopher Immanuel Kant.

Entering Academia

In 1882, Weber enrolled in the University of Heidelberg as a law student, later transferring to Friedrich Wilhelm University in Berlin (today's Humboldt University of Berlin) and then the University of Göttingen. Simultaneously with his studies, he worked as a junior lawyer and lecturer. In 1886, Weber passed the examination for Referendar, comparable to the bar association examination in the British and U.S. legal systems. Throughout the late 1880s, Weber continued his study of law and history. Under the tutelage of Levin Goldschmidt, a family acquaintance, Weber earned his law doctorate in 1889 by writing a dissertation on legal history titled Development of the Principle of Joint Liability and a Separate Fund of the General Partnership out of the Household Communities and Commercial Associations in Italian Cities. This work would be used as part of a longer work, On the History of Commercial Partnerships in the Middle Ages, Based on Southern European Documents, published in the same year. Two years later, working with statistician August Meitzen, Weber completed his habilitation, a post-doctoral thesis titled Roman Agrarian History and Its Significance for Public and Private Law. Having thus become a privatdozent, Weber joined the faculty of Friedrich Wilhelm University, lecturing, doing research, and consulting for the government.

Weber's years as a university student was dotted with several periods of military service, the longest of which lasted for a year and started in 1883. After his first few years in university, during which he spent much time "drinking beer and fencing", Weber would increasingly take his mother's side in family arguments and grew estranged from his father.

Marriage

In 1893, Weber married his distant cousin Marianne Schnitger, later a feminist activist and author in her own right, who was instrumental in collecting and publishing Weber's journal articles as books after his death, while her biography of him is an important source for understanding Weber's life. They had no children. The marriage granted long-awaited financial independence to Weber, allowing him to finally leave his parents' household.

Career and later life

Early work

In the years between the completion of his dissertation and habilitation, Weber took an interest in contemporary social policy. In 1888, he joined the Verein für Socialpolitik, a new professional association of German economists affiliated with the historical school, who saw the role of economics primarily as finding solutions to the social problems of the age and who pioneered large scale statistical studies of economic issues. He also involved himself in politics, joining the left-leaning Evangelical Social Congress. In 1890, the Verein established a research program to examine "the Polish question", or ostflucht: the influx of Polish farm workers into eastern Germany as local labourers migrated to Germany's rapidly industrialising cities. Weber was put in charge of the study and wrote a large part of the final report, which generated considerable attention and controversy, marking the beginning of Weber's renown as a social scientist.

From 1893 to 1899, Weber was a member of the Alldeutscher Verband (Pan-German League), an organization that campaigned against the influx of the Polish workers; the degree of Weber's support for the Germanisation of Poles and similar nationalist policies is still debated by modern scholars. In some of his work, in particular his provocative lecture on "The Nation State and Economic Policy" delivered in 1895, Weber criticises the immigration of Poles and blames the Junker class for perpetuating Slavic immigration to serve their selfish interests.

Weber and his wife, Marianne, moved to Freiburg in 1894, where Weber was appointed professor of economics at the Albert-Ludwigs University, before accepting the same position at the University of Heidelberg in 1896. There, Weber became a central figure in the so-called "Weber Circle", composed of other intellectuals, including his wife Marianne, as well as Georg Jellinek, Ernst Troeltsch, Werner Sombart and Robert Michels. Weber also remained active in the Verein and the Evangelical Social Congress. His research in that period was focused on economics and legal history.

Mental health concerns

In 1897, Weber Sr. died two months after a severe quarrel with his son that was never resolved. After this, Weber became increasingly prone to depression, nervousness and insomnia, making it difficult for him to fulfill his duties as a professor. His condition forced him to reduce his teaching and eventually leave his course unfinished in the autumn of 1899. After spending the summer and autumn of 1900 in a sanatorium, Weber and his wife travelled to Italy at the end of the year, not returning to Heidelberg until April 1902. He would again withdraw from teaching in 1903 and would not return until 1919. Weber's ordeal with mental illness was carefully described in a personal chronology that was destroyed by his wife. This chronicle was supposedly destroyed because Marianne feared that Weber's work would be discredited by the Nazis if his experience with mental illness were widely known.

Later work

After Weber's immense productivity in the early 1890s, he did not publish any papers between early 1898 and late 1902, finally resigning his professorship in late 1903. Freed from those obligations, in that year he accepted a position as associate editor of the Archives for Social Science and Social Welfare, where he worked with his colleagues  and Werner Sombart. His new interests would lie in more fundamental issues of social sciences; his works from this latter period are of primary interest to modern scholars. In 1904, Weber began to publish some of his most seminal papers in this journal, notably his essay The Protestant Ethic and the Spirit of Capitalism, which became his most famous work and laid the foundations for his later research on the impact of cultures and religions on the development of economic systems. This essay was the only one of his works from that period that was published as a book during his lifetime. Some other of his works written in the first one and a half decades of the 20th centurypublished posthumously and dedicated primarily from the fields of sociology of religion, economic and legal sociologyare also recognised as among his most important intellectual contributions.

Also in 1904, Weber visited the United States, participating in the Congress of Arts and Sciences held in connection with the World's fair (Louisiana Purchase Exposition) in St. Louis. A monument to his visit was placed at the home of relatives whom Weber visited in Mt. Airy, North Carolina.

Despite his partial recovery evident in America, Weber felt that he was unable to resume regular teaching at that time and continued on as a private scholar, helped by an inheritance in 1907. In 1909, disappointed with the Verein, he co-founded the German Sociological Association (or DGS) and served as its first treasurer, though resigning in 1912.

Political involvements

Later in 1912, Weber tried to organise a left-wing political party to combine social-democrats and liberals. This attempt was unsuccessful, in part because many liberals feared social-democratic revolutionary ideals.

World War I

At the outbreak of World War I, Weber, aged 50, volunteered for service and was appointed as a reserve officer in charge of organizing the army hospitals in Heidelberg, a role he fulfilled until the end of 1915. Weber's views on the war and the expansion of the German empire changed during the course of the conflict. Early on, he supported nationalist rhetoric and the war effort, though with some hesitation, viewing the war as a necessity to fulfill German duty as a leading state power. In time, however, Weber became one of the most prominent critics of German expansionism and of the Kaiser's war policies. Weber publicly attacked the Belgian annexation policy and unrestricted submarine warfare, later supporting calls for constitutional reform, democratisation, and universal suffrage.

Post-World War I

Weber joined the worker and soldier council of Heidelberg in 1918. He then served in the German delegation to the Paris Peace Conference and as advisor to the Confidential Committee for Constitutional Reform, which drafted the Weimar Constitution. Motivated by his understanding of the American model, he advocated a strong, popularly elected presidency as a constitutional counterbalance to the power of the professional bureaucracy. More controversially, he also defended the provisions for emergency presidential powers that became Article 48 of the Weimar Constitution. These provisions were later used by Adolf Hitler to subvert the rest of the constitution and institute rule by decree, allowing his regime to suppress opposition and gain dictatorial powers.

Weber would also run, though unsuccessfully, for a parliamentary seat, as a member of the liberal German Democratic Party, which he had co-founded. He opposed both the leftist German Revolution of 1918–1919 and the ratification of the Treaty of Versailles, principled positions that defied the political alignments in Germany at that time, and which may have prevented Friedrich Ebert, the new social-democratic President of Germany, from appointing Weber as minister or ambassador. Weber commanded widespread respect but relatively little influence. Weber's role in German politics remains controversial to this day.

In Weber's critique of the left, he complained of the leaders of the leftist Spartacus League, led by Karl Liebknecht and Rosa Luxemburg, that controlled the city government of Berlin while Weber was campaigning for his party:We have this [German] revolution to thank for the fact that we cannot send a single division against the Poles. All we see is dirt, muck, dung, and horse-playnothing else. Liebknecht belongs in the madhouse and Rosa Luxemburg in the zoological gardens.

Weber was, at the same time, critical of the Versailles Treaty, which he believed unjustly assigned "war guilt" to Germany when it came to the war, as Weber believed that many countries were guilty of starting it, not just Germany. In making this case, Weber argued:
In the case of this war there is one, and only one power that desired it under all circumstances through its own will and, according to their political goals required: Russia.... It never crossed [my] mind that a German invasion of Belgium [in 1914] was nothing but an innocent act on the part of the Germans.

Later that same month, in January 1919, after Weber and his party were defeated for election, Weber delivered one of his greatest academic lectures, "Politics as a Vocation", which reflected on the inherent violence and dishonesty he saw among politiciansa profession in which only recently Weber was so personally active. About the nature of politicians, he concluded that, "in nine out of ten cases they are windbags puffed up with hot air about themselves. They are not in touch with reality, and they do not feel the burden they need to shoulder; they just intoxicate themselves with romantic sensations."

Last years

Frustrated with politics, Weber resumed teaching during this time, first at the University of Vienna, then, after 1919, at the University of Munich. His lectures from that period were collected into major works, such as the General Economic History, Science as a Vocation, and Politics as a Vocation. In Munich, he headed the first German university institute of sociology, but never held a professorial position in the discipline. Many colleagues and students in Munich attacked his response to the German Revolution, while some right-wing students held protests in front of his home.

On 14 June 1920, Max Weber contracted the Spanish flu and died of pneumonia in Munich. At the time of his death, Weber had not finished writing his  on sociological theory: Economy and Society. His widow, Marianne, helped prepare it for its publication in 1921–1922.

Methodology

Sociology, for Max Weber, is "a science which attempts the interpretive understanding of social action in order thereby to arrive at a causal explanation of its course and effects".

Made clear in his methodology, Weber distinguished himself from Durkheim, Marx, and other classical figures, in that (a) his primary focus would be on individuals and culture; and (b) unlike theorists such as Comte and Durkheim, he did not (consciously) attempt to create any specific set of rules governing sociology or the social sciences in general. Whereas Durkheim focused on the society, Weber concentrated on the individual and their actions (i.e. structure and action). Compared to Marx, who argued for the primacy of the material world over the world of ideas, Weber valued ideas as motivating actions of individuals, at least in the big picture.

Verstehen

Weber would primarily be concerned with the question of objectivity and subjectivity, going on to distinguish social action from social behavior, noting that social action must be understood through how individuals subjectively relate to one another. Social actions may have easily identifiable and objective means, but much more subjective ends and the understanding of those ends by a scientist is subject to yet another layer of subjective understanding (that of the scientist). Weber noted that the importance of subjectivity in social sciences makes creation of fool-proof, universal laws much more difficult than in natural sciences and that the amount of objective knowledge that social sciences may achieve is precariously limited.

Overall, Weber supported the goal of objective science as one definitely worth striving for, though he noted that it is ultimately an unreachable goal:

The principle of methodological individualism, which holds that social scientists should seek to understand collectivities (e.g. nations, cultures, governments, churches, corporations, etc.) solely as the result and the context of the actions of individual persons, can be traced to Weber, particularly to the first chapter of Economy and Society, in which he argues that only individuals "can be treated as agents in a course of subjectively understandable action". In other words, Weber contended that social phenomena can be understood scientifically only to the extent that they are captured by models of the behaviour of purposeful individualsmodels that Weber called "ideal types"from which actual historical events necessarily deviate due to accidental and irrational factors. The analytical constructs of an ideal type never exist in reality, but provide objective benchmarks against which real-life constructs can be measured:

Weber's methodology was developed in the context of a wider debate about methodology of social sciences, the Methodenstreit ("method dispute"). Weber's position was close to historicism, as he understood social actions as being heavily tied to particular historical contexts and its analysis required the understanding of subjective motivations of individuals (social actors). Thus Weber's methodology emphasises the use of comparative historical analysis. As such, Weber was more interested in explaining how a certain outcome was the result of various historical processes rather than predicting an outcome of those processes in the future.

Theories

Bureaucratic model (rational-legal model)

Max Weber's theory of bureaucracy, also known as the "rational-legal" model, attempts to explain bureaucracy from a rational point of view. Firstly, Weber argued that bureaucracy is "based on the general principle of precisely defined and organized across-the-board competencies of the various offices" which are "underpinned by rules, laws, or administrative regulations."

In particular, Weber notes three aspects that "constitute the essence of bureaucratic administration" in the public sector, and "the essence of a bureaucratic management of a private company" in the private sector:
 A rigid division of labor is established that clearly identifies regular tasks and duties of the particular bureaucratic system.
 Regulations describe firmly established chains of command and the duties and capacity to coerce others to comply.
 Hiring people with particular, certified qualifications supports regular and continuous execution of the assigned duties.

In this sense, Weber would explain bureaucracy through nine main characteristics/principles:

 Specialized roles
 Recruitment based on merit (e.g. tested through open competition)
 Uniform principles of placement, promotion, and transfer in an administrative system
 Careerism with systematic salary structure
 Hierarchy, responsibility and accountability
 Subjection of official conduct to strict rules of discipline and control
 Supremacy of abstract rules
 Impersonal authority (e.g. office bearer does not bring the office with them)
 Political neutrality

Benefits of bureaucracy

As Weber noted, real bureaucracy is less optimal and effective than his ideal-type model. Each of Weber's principles can degenerate, especially when used to analyze individual levels in an organization. However, when implemented in a group setting in an organization, some form of efficiency and effectiveness can be achieved, especially with regard to better output. This is especially true when the Bureaucratic Model emphasizes qualification (merits), specialization of job-scope (labour), hierarchy of power, rules, and discipline.

Weaknesses of bureaucracy

Competencies, efficiency and effectiveness can be unclear and contradictory, especially when dealing with oversimplified matters. In a dehumanized bureaucracyinflexible in distributing the job-scope, with every worker having to specialize from day one without rotating tasks for fear of decreasing outputtasks are often routine and can contribute to boredom. Thus, employees can sometimes feel that they are not part of the organization's work vision and mission. Consequently, they do not have any sense of belonging in the long term. Furthermore, this type of organization tends to invite exploitation and underestimate the potential of the employees, as creativity of the workers is brushed aside in favour of strict adherence to rules, regulations and procedures.

Rationalisation

Many scholars have described rationalisation and the question of individual freedom in an increasingly rational society, as the main theme of Weber's work. This theme was situated in the larger context of the relationship between psychological motivations, cultural values and beliefs (primarily religion), and the structure of the society (usually determined by the economy).

Weber understood rationalisation, first, as the individual cost-benefit calculation; second, as the wider bureaucratic organisation of the organisations; and finally, in the more general sense, as the opposite of understanding the reality through mystery and magic (i.e. disenchantment).The fate of our times is characterised by rationalisation and intellectualisation and, above all, by the "disenchantment of the world".

Weber began his studies of the subject in The Protestant Ethic and the Spirit of Capitalism, in which he argued that the redefinition of the connection between work and piety in Protestantism and especially in ascetic Protestant denominations, particularly Calvinism, shifted human effort towards rational efforts aimed at achieving economic gain. In the Protestant religion, piety towards God was expressed through one's secular vocation (secularisation of calling). The rational roots of this doctrine, he argued, soon grew incompatible with and larger than the religious and so the latter were eventually discarded.

Weber continued his investigation into this matter in later works, notably in his studies on bureaucracy and on the classification of legitimate authority into three typesrational-legal, traditional and charismaticof which the rational-legal (through bureaucracy) is the dominant one in the modern world. In these works Weber described what he saw as society's movement towards rationalisation.  Similarly, rationalisation could be seen in the economy, with the development of highly rational and calculating capitalism. Weber also saw rationalisation as one of the main factors setting the European West apart from the rest of the world. Rationalisation relied on deep changes in ethics, religion, psychology and culture; changes that first took place in the Western civilisation:

Features of rationalisation include increasing knowledge, growing impersonality and enhanced control of social and material life. Weber was ambivalent towards rationalisation; while admitting it was responsible for many advances, in particular, freeing humans from traditional, restrictive and illogical social guidelines, he also criticised it for dehumanising individuals as "cogs in the machine" and curtailing their freedom, trapping them in the bureaucratic iron cage of rationality and bureaucracy. Related to rationalisation is the process of disenchantment, in which the world is becoming more explained and less mystical, moving from polytheistic religions to monotheistic ones and finally to the Godless science of modernity. However, another interpretation of Weber's theory of disenchantment, advanced by historian of religion Jason Josephson-Storm, claims that Weber does not envision a binary between rationalisation and magical thinking, and that Weber actually referred to the sequestering and professionalisation of magic when he described disenchantment, not to the disappearances of magic. Regardless, for Weber the processes of rationalisation affect all of society, removing "sublime values... from public life" and making art less creative.

In a dystopian critique of rationalisation, Weber notes that modern society is a product of an individualistic drive of the Reformation, yet at the same time, the society created in this process is less and less welcoming of individualism: "How is it at all possible to salvage any remnants of 'individual' freedom of movement in any sense given this all-powerful trend?"

Sociology of religion

Weber's work in the field of sociology of religion began with the essay The Protestant Ethic and the Spirit of Capitalism and continued with his analyses in The Religion of China, The Religion of India, and Ancient Judaism. His work on other religions, however, would be interrupted by his sudden death in 1920, which prevented him from following Ancient Judaism with studies of early Christianity and Islam. The three main themes within the essays were: the effect of religious ideas on economic activities; the relation between social stratification and religious ideas; and the distinguishable characteristics of Western civilisation.

Weber saw religion as one of the core forces in society. His goal was to find reasons for the different development paths of the cultures of the Occident and the Orient, although without judging or valuing them, like some of the contemporary thinkers who followed the social Darwinist paradigm; Weber wanted primarily to explain the distinctive elements of the Western civilisation. He maintained that Calvinist (and more widely, Protestant) religious ideas had a major impact on the social innovation and development of the economic system of the West, but noted that they were not the only factors in this development. Other notable factors mentioned by Weber included the rationalism of scientific pursuit, merging observation with mathematics, science of scholarship and jurisprudence, rational systematisation and bureaucratisation of government administration and economic enterprise. In the end, the study of the sociology of religion, according to Weber, focused on one distinguishing part of the Western culture, the decline of beliefs in magic, or what he referred to as "disenchantment of the world".

Weber was a critic of Islam and hedonism. He argued that hedonism plays a role in Islamic ethics and teachings, in which worldly pleasures such as military interests and the "acquisition of booty" are emphasised. According to Weber, Islam is the polar opposite of ascetic puritanism.

Weber also proposed a socio-evolutionary model of religious change, showing that in general, societies have moved from magic to polytheism, then to pantheism, monotheism and finally, ethical monotheism. According to Weber, this evolution occurred as the growing economic stability allowed professionalisation and the evolution of ever more sophisticated priesthood. As societies grew more complex and encompassed different groups, a hierarchy of gods developed and as power in the society became more centralised, the concept of a single, universal God became more popular and desirable.

The Protestant Ethic and the Spirit of Capitalism

The Protestant Ethic and the Spirit of Capitalism is Weber's most famous work. It has been argued that this work should not be viewed as a detailed study of Protestantism, but rather as an introduction into Weber's later works, especially his studies of interaction between various religious ideas and economic behaviour as part of the rationalisation of the economic sphere. In the essay, Weber puts forward the thesis that Calvinist ethic and ideas influenced the development of capitalism. He notes the post-Reformation shift of Europe's economic centre away from Catholic countries such as France, Spain and Italy, and toward Protestant countries such as the Netherlands, England, Scotland, and Germany. Weber also notes that societies having more Protestants were those with a more highly developed capitalist economy. Similarly, in societies with different religions, most successful business leaders were Protestant. Weber thus argued that Roman Catholicism impeded the development of the capitalist economy in the West, as did other religions such as Confucianism and Buddhism elsewhere in the world:

Christian religious devotion had historically been accompanied by rejection of mundane affairs, including economic pursuit. Weber showed that certain types of Protestantismnotably Calvinismwere supportive of rational pursuit of economic gain and worldly activities dedicated to it, seeing them as endowed with moral and spiritual significance. Weber argued that there were many reasons to look for the origins of modern capitalism in the religious ideas of the Reformation. In particular, the Protestant ethic (or more specifically, Calvinist ethic) motivated the believers to work hard, be successful in business, and reinvest their profits in further development rather than frivolous pleasures. The notion of calling meant that each individual had to take action as an indication of their salvation; just being a member of the Church was not enough. Predestination also reduced agonising over economic inequality and further, it meant that a material wealth could be taken as a sign of salvation in the afterlife. The believers therefore justified pursuit of profit with religion, as instead of being fuelled by morally suspect greed or ambition, their actions were motivated by a highly moral and respected philosophy. Weber would call this the "spirit of capitalism": it was the Protestant religious ideology that was behindand inevitably led tothe capitalist economic system. This theory is often viewed as a reversal of Karl Marx's thesis that the economic "base" of society determines all other aspects of it.

Weber abandoned research into Protestantism as his colleague Ernst Troeltsch, a professional theologian, had begun work on the book Social Teachings of the Christian Churches and Sects. Another reason for Weber's decision was that Troeltsch's work already achieved what he desired in that area: laying the groundwork for a comparative analysis of religion and society.

The phrase "work ethic" used in modern commentary is a derivative of the "Protestant ethic" discussed by Weber. It was adopted when the idea of the Protestant ethic was expanded to apply to the Japanese, Jews and other non-Christians.

The Religion of China

The Religion of China: Confucianism and Taoism was Weber's second major work on the sociology of religion. Hans H. Gerth edited and translated this text into English, with an introduction by C.K. Wang. Weber focused on those aspects of Chinese society that were different from those of Western Europe, especially those aspects that contrasted with Puritanism. His work also questioned why capitalism did not develop in China. He focused on the issues of Chinese urban development, Chinese patrimonialism and officialdom and Chinese religion and philosophy (primarily, Confucianism and Taoism), as the areas in which Chinese development differed most distinctively from the European route.

According to Weber, Confucianism and Puritanism are mutually exclusive types of rational thought, each attempting to prescribe a way of life based on religious dogma. Notably, they both valued self-control and restraint and did not oppose accumulation of wealth. However, to both those qualities were just means to the final goal and here they were divided by a key difference. Confucianism's goal was "a cultured status position", while Puritanism's goal was to create individuals who are "tools of God". The intensity of belief and enthusiasm for action were rare in Confucianism, but common in Protestantism. Actively working for wealth was unbecoming a proper Confucian. Therefore, Weber states that it was this difference in social attitudes and mentality, shaped by the respective, dominant religions, that contributed to the development of capitalism in the West and the absence of it in China.

The Religion of India

The Religion of India: The Sociology of Hinduism and Buddhism was Weber's third major work on the sociology of religion. In this work he deals with the structure of Indian society, with the orthodox doctrines of Hinduism and the heterodox doctrines of Buddhism, with modifications brought by the influence of popular religiosity and finally with the impact of religious beliefs on the secular ethic of Indian society. In Weber's view, Hinduism in India, like Confucianism in China, was a barrier for capitalism. The Indian caste system made it very difficult for individuals to advance in the society beyond their caste. Activity, including economic activity, was seen as unimportant in the context of the advancement of the soul. He noted, “Perhaps the most important gap in the ancient Veda is its lack of any reference to caste…. nowhere does it refer to the substantive content of the caste order in the meaning which it later assumed and which is characteristic only of Hinduism”.

Weber ended his research of society and religion in India by bringing in insights from his previous work on China to discuss similarities of the Asian belief systems. He notes that the beliefs saw the meaning of life as otherworldly mystical experience. The social world is fundamentally divided between the educated elite, following the guidance of a prophet or wise man and the uneducated masses whose beliefs are centered on magic. In Asia, there was no Messianic prophecy to give plan and meaning to the everyday life of educated and uneducated alike. Weber juxtaposed such Messianic prophecies (aka ethical prophecies), notably from the Near East region to the exemplary prophecies found on the Asiatic mainland, focused more on reaching to the educated elites and enlightening them on the proper ways to live one's life, usually with little emphasis on hard work and the material world. It was those differences that prevented the countries of the Occident from following the paths of the earlier Chinese and Indian civilisations. His next work, Ancient Judaism was an attempt to prove this theory.

Ancient Judaism

In Ancient Judaism, his fourth major work on the sociology of religion, Weber attempted to explain the factors that resulted in the early differences between Oriental and Occidental religiosity. He contrasted the innerworldly asceticism developed by Western Christianity with mystical contemplation of the kind developed in India. Weber noted that some aspects of Christianity sought to conquer and change the world, rather than withdraw from its imperfections. This fundamental characteristic of Christianity (when compared to Far Eastern religions) stems originally from ancient Jewish prophecy.

Weber claimed that Judaism not only fathered Christianity and Islam, but was crucial to the rise of the modern Occidental state; Judaism's influence was as important as Hellenistic and Roman cultures.

Weber's death in 1920 prevented him from following his planned analysis of Psalms, the Book of Job, Talmudic Jewry, early Christianity and Islam.

Theodicy of fortune and misfortune

The 'theodicy of fortune and misfortune' within sociology is the theory, as Weber suggested, of how "members of different social classes adopt different belief systems, or theodices, to explain their social situation."

The concept of theodicy was expanded mainly with the thought of Weber and his addition of ethical considerations to the subject of religion. There is an ethical part of religion, that includes:

 Soteriology: how people understand themselves to be capable of a correct relationship with supernatural powers; and
 Theodicy: how to explain evilor why bad things seem to happen to those who seem to be good people.

There is a separation of different theodicies with regard to class: "theodicies of misfortune tend to the belief that wealth and other manifestations of privilege are indications or signs of evil.... In contrast, theodicies of fortune emphasise the notion that privileges are a blessing and are deserved."

Weber also distinguishes that, "the affluent embrace good fortune theodicies, which emphasise that prosperity is a blessing of God [while] theodices of misfortune emphasise that affluence is a sign of evil and that suffering in this world will be rewarded in the next." Therefore, these two distinctions can be applied not only to class structure within society but denomination and racial segregation within religion.

Weber defines the importance of societal class within religion by examining the difference between the two theodicies and to what class structures they apply. The concept of "work ethic" is attached to the theodicy of fortune; thus, because of the Protestant "work ethic", there was a contribution of higher class outcomes and more education among Protestants. Those without the work ethic clung to the theodicy of misfortune, believing wealth and happiness were granted in the afterlife. Another example of how this belief of religious theodicy influences class, is that those of lower status, the poor, cling to deep religiousness and faith as a way to comfort themselves and provide hope for a more prosperous future, while those of higher status cling to the sacraments or actions that prove their right of possessing greater wealth.

These two theodicies manifest in socioeconomic stratification within religiously similar groups. For example, U.S. American "mainline" Protestant churches with upper class congregations generally "promote order, stability, and conservatism, and in so doing proved to be a powerful source of legitimation of the status quo and of existing disparities in the distribution of wealth and power," because much of the wealth of the church comes from the congregation. In contrast, Pentecostal churches find their roots in among working class persons with a theodicy of misfortune. Instead of supporting status quo, these churches may advocate "change intended to advance the cause of justice and fairness". The theodicies of these churches, which are enmeshed in their origins, practices, and preaching, thus reinforce segregation by social class.

The state, politics, and government

In political sociology, one of Weber's most influential contributions is his essay "Politik als Beruf" ("Politics as a Vocation"), in which he defines "the state" as an entity that possesses a monopoly on the legitimate use of physical force.

Accordingly, Weber proposed that politics is the sharing of state power between various groups, whereas political leaders are those who wield this power. As such, a politician, in Weber's view, must not be a man of the "true Christian ethic" (i.e. the ethic of the Sermon on the Mount), in that one cannot have the injunction to 'turn the other cheek'. An adherent of such an ethic ought rather to be understood as a saint, for it is only saints, according to Weber, that can appropriately follow it. The political realm is no realm for saints; a politician ought to marry the verantwortungsethik and the gesinnungsethik ("ethic of responsibility" and the "ethic of attitude") and must possess both a passion for his vocation and the capacity to distance himself from the subject of his exertions (the governed).

Weber distinguished three ideal types of political leadership (aka three types of domination, legitimisation or authority):

 Charismatic authority (familial and religious);
 Traditional authority (patriarchs, patrimonialism, feudalism); and
 Legal authority (modern law and state, bureaucracy).

In his view, every historical relation between rulers and ruled contained such elements, which can be analysed on the basis of this tripartite distinction. Weber notes that the instability of charismatic authority forces it to "routinise" into a more structured form of authority. In a pure type of traditional rule, sufficient resistance to a ruler can lead to a "traditional revolution". The move towards a rational-legal structure of authority, using a bureaucratic structure, is inevitable in the end. Thus this theory can be sometimes viewed as part of the social evolutionism theory. This ties to his broader concept of rationalisation by suggesting the inevitability of a move in this direction.

Weber described many ideal types of public administration and government in his masterpiece Economy and Society (1922). His critical study of the bureaucratisation of society became one of the most enduring parts of his work. It was Weber who began the studies of bureaucracy and whose works led to the popularisation of this term. Many aspects of modern public administration go back to him and a classic, hierarchically organised civil service of the Continental type is called "Weberian civil service". As the most efficient and rational way of organising, bureaucratisation for Weber was the key part of the rational-legal authority and furthermore, he saw it as the key process in the ongoing rationalisation of the Western society.

Weber listed several preconditions for the emergence of the bureaucracy, which resulted in a need for a more efficient administrative system, including:
 The growth in space and population being administered
 The growth in complexity of the administrative tasks being carried out and the existence of a monetary economy.

Development of communication and transportation technologies made more efficient administration possible (and popularly requested) and democratisation and rationalisation of culture resulted in demands that the new system treat everybody equally.

Weber's ideal bureaucracy is characterised by hierarchical organisation, by delineated lines of authority in a fixed area of activity, by action taken (and recorded) on the basis of written rules, by bureaucratic officials needing expert training, by rules being implemented neutrally and by career advancement depending on technical qualifications judged by organisations, not by individuals.

While recognising bureaucracy as the most efficient form of organisation and even indispensable for the modern state, Weber also saw it as a threat to individual freedoms and the ongoing bureaucratisation as leading to a "polar night of icy darkness", in which increasing rationalisation of human life traps individuals in the aforementioned "iron cage" of bureaucratic, rule-based, rational control. To counteract bureaucrats, the system needs entrepreneurs and politicians.

Social stratification

Weber also formulated a three-component theory of stratification, with social class, social status and political party as conceptually distinct elements. The three-component theory of stratification is in contrast to Karl Marx simpler theory of social class that ties all social stratification to what people own. In Weber's theory, issues of honour and prestige are important. This distinction is most clearly described in Weber's essay Classes, Staende, Parties, which was first published in his book Economy and Society. 

The three components of Weber's theory are:

 Social class - Based on economically determined relationship to the market (owner, renter, employee, etc.)
 Status - Based on non-economic qualities like honour, prestige, and religion
 Party - Affiliations in the political domain

All three dimensions have consequences for what Weber called "life chances" (opportunities to improve one's life). Weber scholars maintain a sharp distinction between the terms status and class, even though, in casual use, people tend to use them interchangeably.

Study of the city

As part of his overarching effort to understand the unique development of the Western world, Weber produced a detailed general study of the city as the characteristic locus of the social and economic relations, political arrangements, and ideas that eventually came to define the West. This resulted in a monograph, The City, which he probably compiled from research conducted in 1911–1913. It was published posthumously in 1921, and, in 1924, was incorporated into the second part of his Economy and Society, as the sixteenth chapter, "The City (Non-legitimate Domination)".

According to Weber, the city as a politically autonomous organisation of people living in close proximity, employed in a variety of specialised trades, and physically separated from the surrounding countryside, only fully developed in the West and to a great extent shaped its cultural evolution:

Weber argued that Judaism, early Christianity, theology, and later the political party and modern science, were only possible in the urban context that reached a full development in the West alone. He also saw in the history of medieval European cities the rise of a unique form of "non-legitimate domination" that successfully challenged the existing forms of legitimate domination (traditional, charismatic, and rational-legal) that had prevailed until then in the Medieval world. This new domination was based on the great economic and military power wielded by the organised community of city-dwellers ("citizens").

Economics

Weber regarded himself primarily as a "political economist", and all his professorial appointments were in economics, though today his contributions in that field are largely overshadowed by his role as a founder of modern sociology. As an economist, Weber belonged to the "youngest" German historical school of economics. The great differences between that school's interests and methods on the one hand and those of the neoclassical school (from which modern mainstream economics largely derives) on the other, explain why Weber's influence on economics today is hard to discern.

Economy and Society

Weber's magnum opus Economy and Society is a collection of his essays that he was working on at the time of his death in 1920. After his death, the final organization and editing of the book fell to his widow Marianne. The final German form published in 1921 reflected very much Marianne's work and intellectual commitment. The composition includes a wide range of essays dealing with Weber's views regarding sociology, social philosophy, politics, social stratification, world religion, diplomacy, and other subjects.

Beginning in 1956, the German jurist Johannes Winckelmann began editing and organizing the German edition of Economy and Society based on his study of the papers that Weber left at his death. English versions of the work were published as a collected volume in 1968, as edited by Gunther Roth and Claus Wittich. As a result of the various editions in German and English, there are differences between the organization of the different volumes. The book is typically published in a two volume set in both German and English, and is more than 1000 pages long.

Methodological individualism

Though his research interests were always in line with those of the German historicists, with a strong emphasis on interpreting economic history, Weber's defence of "methodological individualism" in the social sciences represented an important break with that school and an embracing of many of the arguments that had been made against the historicists by Carl Menger, the founder of the Austrian School of economics, in the context of the academic Methodenstreit ("debate over methods") of the late 19th century. The phrase methodological individualism, which has come into common usage in modern debates about the connection between microeconomics and macroeconomics, was coined by the Austrian-American economist Joseph Schumpeter in 1908 as a way of referring to the views of Weber. According to Weber's theses, social research cannot be fully inductive or descriptive, because understanding some phenomenon implies that the researcher must go beyond mere description and interpret it; interpretation requires classification according to abstract "ideal (pure) types". This, together with his antipositivistic argumentation (see Verstehen), can be taken as a methodological justification for the model of the "rational economic man" (homo economicus), which is at the heart of modern mainstream economics.

Marginalism and psychophysics

Unlike other historicists, Weber also accepted the marginal theory of value (aka "marginalism") and taught it to his students. In 1908, Weber published an article in which he drew a sharp methodological distinction between psychology and economics and attacked the claims that the marginal theory of value in economics reflected the form of the psychological response to stimuli as described by the Weber-Fechner law. Max Weber's article has been cited as a definitive refutation of the dependence of the economic theory of value on the laws of psychophysics by Lionel Robbins, George Stigler, and Friedrich Hayek, though the broader issue of the relation between economics and psychology has come back into the academic debate with the development of "behavioral economics".

Economic history

Weber's best known work in economics concerned the preconditions for capitalist development, particularly the relations between religion and capitalism, which he explored in The Protestant Ethic and the Spirit of Capitalism as well as in his other works on the sociology of religion. He argued that bureaucratic political and economic systems emerging in the Middle Ages were essential in the rise of modern capitalism (including rational book-keeping and organisation of formally free labour), while they were a hindrance in the case of ancient capitalism, which had a different social and political structure based on conquest, slavery, and the coastal city-state. Other contributions include his early work on the economic history of Roman agrarian society (1891) and on the labour relations in Eastern Germany (1892), his analysis of the history of commercial partnerships in the Middle Ages (1889), his critique of Marxism, the discussion of the roles of idealism and materialism in the history of capitalism in his Economy and Society (1922) and his General Economic History (1923), a notable example of the kind of empirical work associated with the German Historical School.

Although today Weber is primarily read by sociologists and social philosophers, Weber's work did have a significant influence on Frank Knight, one of the founders of the neoclassical Chicago school of economics, who translated Weber's General Economic History into English in 1927. Knight also wrote in 1956 that Max Weber was the only economist who dealt with the problem of understanding the emergence of modern capitalism "...from the angle which alone can yield an answer to such questions, that is, the angle of comparative history in the broad sense."

Economic calculation

Weber, like his colleague Werner Sombart, regarded economic calculation and especially the double-entry bookkeeping method of business accounting, as one of the most important forms of rationalisation associated with the development of modern capitalism. Weber's preoccupation with the importance of economic calculation led him to critique socialism as a system that lacked a mechanism for allocating resources efficiently to satisfy human needs. Socialist intellectuals like Otto Neurath had realised that in a completely socialised economy, prices would not exist and central planners would have to resort to in-kind (rather than monetary) economic calculation. According to Weber, this type of coordination would be inefficient, especially because it would be incapable of solving the problem of imputation (i.e. of accurately determining the relative values of capital goods). Weber wrote that, under full socialism:

This argument against socialism was made independently, at about the same time, by Ludwig von Mises. Weber himself had a significant influence on Mises, whom he had befriended when they were both at the University of Vienna in the spring of 1918, and, through Mises, on several other economists associated with the Austrian School in the 20th century. Friedrich Hayek in particular elaborated the arguments of Weber and Mises about economic calculation into a central part of free market economics's intellectual assault on socialism, as well as into a model for the spontaneous coordination of "dispersed knowledge" in markets.

Inspirations

Kantianism

Weber's thinking was strongly influenced by German idealism, particularly by neo-Kantianism, which he had been exposed to through Heinrich Rickert, his professorial colleague at the University of Freiburg. Especially important to Weber's work is the neo-Kantian belief that reality is essentially chaotic and incomprehensible, with all rational order deriving from the way the human mind focuses attention on certain aspects of reality and organises the resulting perceptions. Weber's opinions regarding the methodology of the social sciences show parallels with the work of contemporary neo-Kantian philosopher and pioneering sociologist Georg Simmel.

Weber was also influenced by Kantian ethics, which he nonetheless came to think of as obsolete in a modern age lacking in religious certainties. In this last respect, the influence of Friedrich Nietzsche's philosophy is evident. According to the Stanford Encyclopedia of Philosophy, the "deep tension between the Kantian moral imperatives and a Nietzschean diagnosis of the modern cultural world is apparently what gives such a darkly tragic and agnostic shade to Weber's ethical worldview."

Marxism

Another major influence in Weber's life was the writings of Karl Marx and the workings of socialist thought in academia and active politics. While Weber shares some of Marx's consternation with bureaucratic systems and maligns them as being capable of advancing their own logic to the detriment of human freedom and autonomy, Weber views conflict as perpetual and inevitable and does not host the spirit of a materially available utopia.

Writing in 1932, Karl Löwith contrasted the work of Marx and Weber, arguing that both were interested in the causes and effects of Western capitalism but that Marx viewed capitalism through the lens of alienation while Weber used the concept of rationalization.

Though the influence of his mother's Calvinist religiosity is evident throughout Weber's life and work as he maintained a deep, lifelong interest in the study of religions, Weber was open about the fact that he was personally irreligious.

Economics and historicism

As a political economist and economic historian, Weber belonged to the "youngest" German historical school of economics, represented by academics such as Gustav von Schmoller and his student Werner Sombart. However, even though Weber's research interests were very much in line with this school, his views on methodology and the theory of value diverged significantly from those of other German historicists and were closer, in fact, to those of Carl Menger and the Austrian School, the traditional rivals of the historical school.

Occultism

New research suggests that some of Weber's theories, including his interest in the sociology of Far Eastern religion and elements of his theory of disenchantment, were actually shaped by Weber's interaction with contemporary German occult figures. He is known to have visited the Ordo Templi Orientis at Monte Verità shortly before articulating his idea of disenchantment. He is known to have met the German poet and occultist Stefan George and developed some elements of his theory of charisma after observing George. However, Weber disagreed with many of George's views and never formally joined George's occult circle. Weber may have also had his first exposure to Taoism, albeit in a Westernized form, through Gustav Gräser at Monte Verità. Research on Weber's engagement with the occult has led some German and American scholars to re-interpret his theories of disenchantment.

Legacy

Weber's most influential work was on economic sociology, political sociology, and the sociology of religion. Along with Karl Marx and Émile Durkheim, he is commonly regarded as one of the founders of modern sociology. But whereas Durkheim, following Comte, worked in the positivist tradition, Weber was instrumental in developing an antipositivist, hermeneutic, tradition in the social sciences. In this regard he belongs to a similar tradition as his German colleagues Werner Sombart, Georg Simmel, and Wilhelm Dilthey, who stressed the differences between the methodologies appropriate to the social and the natural sciences.

Weber presented sociology as the science of human social action; action that he separated into traditional, affectional, value-rational and instrumental. To Weber, sociology was:

In his own time, however, Weber was viewed primarily as a historian and an economist. The breadth of Weber's topical interests is apparent in the depth of his social theory, Joachim Radkau (2009) writing:

Many of Weber's works famous today were collected, revised and published posthumously. Significant interpretations of his writings were produced by such sociological luminaries as Talcott Parsons and C. Wright Mills. Parsons in particular imparted to Weber's works a functionalist, teleological perspective; this personal interpretation has been criticised for a latent conservatism.

Weber influenced many later social theorists, such as Theodor Adorno, Max Horkheimer, György Lukács and Jürgen Habermas. His analysis of modernity and rationalisation significantly influenced the critical theory associated with the Frankfurt School. Different elements of his thought were emphasised by Ludwig Lachmann, Carl Schmitt, Joseph Schumpeter, Leo Strauss, Hans Morgenthau, and Raymond Aron. According to the Austrian economist Ludwig von Mises, who had met Weber during his time at the University of Vienna, "The early death of this genius was a great disaster for Germany. Had Weber lived longer, the German people of today would be able to look to this example of an 'Aryan' who would not be broken by National Socialism."

Weber's friend, the psychiatrist and existentialist philosopher Karl Jaspers, described him as "the greatest German of our era". Weber's untimely death felt to Jaspers "as if the German world had lost its heart". Harvard professor Paul Tillich (1968) observed about Weber that he was "perhaps the greatest scholar in Germany of the nineteenth century".

Nicholas Gane, argues that there are similarities between the work of postmodern philosopher Michel Foucault and Weber, with both thinkers being concerned with the effects of rationalization on how people lead their lives. Gane argues that Foucault goes further than Weber in offering two methods for the individual to resist rationalization: by looking at the history of the development of rationalization in so-called genealogy, the factors that influenced this rationalization, and how rationalization differed in the past; and looking at how power relations and current knowledge interaction with particular rationalizations.

Critical responses to Weber

Weber's explanations are highly specific to the historical periods he analysed. Some academics disagree, pointing out that, despite the fact that Weber did write in the early twentieth century, his ideas remain alive and relevant for understanding issues such as politics, bureaucracy, and social stratification today.

Many scholars, however, disagree with specific claims in Weber's historical analysis. For example, the economist Joseph Schumpeter (1954) argued that capitalism did not begin with the Industrial Revolution but in 14th century Italy. In Milan, Venice, and Florence, the small city-state governments led to the development of the earliest forms of capitalism. In the 16th century, Antwerp was a commercial center of Europe. Also, the predominantly Calvinist country of Scotland did not enjoy the same economic growth as the Netherlands, England, and New England. It has been pointed out that the Netherlands, which also had a Calvinist majority, industrialized much later in the 19th century than predominantly Catholic Belgium, which was one of the centers of the Industrial Revolution on the European mainland. Emil Kauder (1953) expanded Schumpeter's argument, by arguing the hypothesis that Calvinism hurt the development of capitalism by leading to the development of the labour theory of value.

Works
For an extensive list of Max Weber's works, see Max Weber bibliography. 

Weber wrote in German. Original titles printed after his death (1920) are most likely compilations of his unfinished works (of the Collected Essays... form). Many translations are made of parts or sections of various German originals and the names of the translations often do not reveal what part of the original they contain. Weber's writings are generally cited according to the critical Max Weber-Gesamtausgabe (Collected Works), published by Mohr Siebeck in Tübingen.

See also

 Interpretations of Max Weber's liberalism
 Robert Michels
 Sociology of law
 Speeches of Max Weber
 Werturteilsstreit

References

Explanatory notes

Citations

Further reading

 
 Bendix, Reinhard. 1960. Max Weber: an Intellectual Portrait. New York, Doubleday.
 
 Collins, R. 1986. Weberian Sociological Theory. New York: Cambridge University Press.
 
 
 
 
 
 
 Marra, Realino (1992), Dalla comunità al diritto moderno. La formazione giuridica di Max Weber. 1882–1889, Giappichelli, Torino
 — (1995), La libertà degli ultimi uomini. Studi sul pensiero giuridico e politico di Max Weber, Giappichelli, Torino
 — (2002), Capitalismo e anticapitalismo in Max Weber. Storia di Roma e sociologia del diritto nella genesi dell'opera weberiana, il Mulino, Bologna
 
 Quensel, Bernhard K. (2007). Max Webers Konstruktionslogik. Sozialökonomik zwischen Geschichte und Theorie. Nomos. . [Revisiting Weber's concept of sociology against the background of his juristic and economic provenance within the framework of "social economics"].
  [The most important work on Weber's life and torments since the biography by Marianne Weber].
  [Translation, with long introduction, of Weber's main writings on law].
 
 Roth, Guenther (2001), Max Webers deutsch-englische Familiengeschichte, J.C.B. Mohr (Paul Siebeck), 
 Lawrence A. Scaff: Max Weber in America, Princeton University Press, Princeton/Oxford, England

External links

Texts of his works
 Max Weber-Gesamtausgabe: collected works  ; homepage
 
 
 Large collection of the German original texts
 A collection of English translations
 Max Weber Reference Archive
 Max Weber, On Politics (1919)
 Large collection of the German original texts
 A comprehensive collection of English translations and secondary literature
 Notes on several of Weber's works, merged into one text file
 Max weber aphorisms

Analyses of his works
 Protestant Ethic Thesis by the Swatos' Encyclopedia of Religion and Society
 Max Weber Studies journal
 
Other encyclopedic entries
 
 
 SocioSite: Famous SociologistsMax Weber Information resources on life, academic work and intellectual influence of Max Weber. Editor: Dr. Albert Benschop (University of Amsterdam).
 

 
1864 births
1920 deaths
19th-century German philosophers
19th-century German writers
19th-century German male writers
20th-century German philosophers
20th-century German writers
Alldeutscher Verband members
Continental philosophers
Critics of work and the work ethic
Deaths from pneumonia in Germany
Deaths from Spanish flu
Economic historians
Economic sociologists
German Democratic Party politicians
German economists
German nationalists
German political philosophers
German sociologists
Heidelberg University alumni
Academic staff of Heidelberg University
Historical school economists
Humboldt University of Berlin alumni
Academic staff of the Ludwig Maximilian University of Munich
Members of the Bavarian Academy of Sciences
National-Social Association politicians
Writers from Erfurt
Organizational theorists
People from the Province of Saxony
Philosophers of culture
Philosophers of economics
Philosophers of history
German social commentators
Social philosophers
Sociologists of law
Sociologists of religion
Symbolic interactionism
Academic staff of the University of Freiburg
University of Göttingen alumni
Writers about activism and social change